Jared Lynn Patterson (born April 1, 1983) is an American politician serving as a member of the Texas House of Representatives from the 106th district. Elected in November 2018, he assumed office on January 8, 2019.

Early life and education

Patterson grew up and attended public school in Whitesboro, Texas. He went on to attend the Grayson County College before transferring to Texas A&M University. He graduated from Texas A&M in 2005 with a Bachelor of Arts degree in political science.

Career
Outside of politics, Jared works as the director of energy services at Rapid Power Management, a retail electric brokerage firm headquartered in Carrollton, Texas.

Patterson served on the Sachse, Texas City Council from 2009 to 2013, serving as Mayor Pro Tem his last year. He also served the community on the Planning & Zoning Committee and Economic Development Commission.

Jared also served one year as a board member for the North Central Texas Council of Governments.

In 2017, he filed to run for the 106 district in the Texas House of Representatives after incumbent Pat Fallon announced his run for Congress. Patterson won 54% of the vote, beating out his primary opponent Clint Bledsoe. He faced Ramona Thompson in the 2018 General Election winning 58.3% of the vote.

In 2019, during the 86th Legislative Session, he authored or sponsored several bills signed into law by Governor Greg Abbott, including property tax reform and the only tollway accountability bill of the session. He served on the House Committees on Business & Industry, Urban Affairs, and Resolutions Calendars, and sat on the policy committee for the Texas House Republican Caucus. In 2019, Patterson was also appointed to serve as a member of the House Aggregate Production Operations Interim Study Committee, and in 2020, to serve on the Texas Cybersecurity Council.

In 2020, Patterson faced a primary challenge from James Trombley winning 76.11% of the Republican Primary vote. He later faced Jennifer Skidonenko in the 2020 General Election winning with 58.5% of the vote during a record turnout, securing 73,692 votes.

In the most recent 87th Session, he authored and championed legislation to assist first responders, expand second amendment rights, improve government efficiency, protect senior citizens, increase education opportunities for foster care children, and safeguard pets. Additionally, he supported and assisted in passing monumental conservative policies such as the Heartbeat Bill, Constitutional Carry, and several measures supporting law enforcement.

Speaker Dade Phelan appointed him to serve on the House Committees on Business & Industry, Homeland Security & Public Safety and the prestigious Calendars Committee. Additionally, Patterson served as a deputy floor Leader and a member of the Policy Committee for the Texas House Republican Caucus.

In 2022 Patterson filed a bill and corresponding constitutional amendment in the Texas legislature to dissolve the city of Austin and create a District of Austin under the control of the state government. The bill was nearly identical to one introduced by State Rep. Briscoe Cain (R-Deer Park) in 2021; that bill died in the House State Affairs Committee. If passed, Patterson's bill would severely weaken the legal principle of local control.

Personal life 
Patterson and his wife, Leslie, reside in Frisco with their three children. The Pattersons are members of First Baptist Church of Frisco.

References

Living people
People from Frisco, Texas
21st-century American politicians
Republican Party members of the Texas House of Representatives
Texas A&M University alumni
1983 births